The Northern Thai people or Tai Yuan , self-designation khon mu(e)ang (  meaning "people of the (cultivated) land" or "people of our community") are a Tai ethnic group, native to nine provinces in Northern Thailand, principally in the area of the former kingdom of Lan Na. As a Tai group, they are closely related to Tai Lü and Tai Khün with regards to common culture, language and history as well as to Thailand's dominant Thai ethnic group (in contrast referred to as Siamese or Central Thai). There are approximately 6 million Tai Yuan. Most of them live in Northern Thailand, with a small minority 29,442 (2005 census) living across the border in Bokeo Province of Laos. Their language is called Northern Thai, Lanna or Kham Mueang.

Exonym and endonym
Central Thai may call northern Thai people and their language Thai Yuan, probably derived from Sanskrit yavana meaning "stranger", which itself comes from the name of the Greek tribe of the Ionians. In everyday speech, "Tai" prefixed to some location is understood as meaning "Tai person" of that place. The British colonial rulers in neighbouring Burma referred to them as Siamese Shan, to distinguish them from the Shan proper, whom they called Burmese Shan.

The people of this ethnicity refer to themselves as khon muang, meaning "people of the (cultivated) land", "people of our community" or "society" (mueang is a central term in Tai languages having a broad meaning, essential to the social structure of Tai peoples). With this name, they historically identified themselves as the inhabitants of the alluvial plains, river valleys, and plateaus of their native area, where they lived in local communities called muang and cultivated rice on paddy fields. This distinguished them from the indigenous peoples of the area ("hill tribes"), like the Lua', who lived in the wooded mountains practicing slash-and-burn agriculture. Membership of the ethnicity was therefore defined by lifestyle rather than by genetics. At the same time, it was a term of dissociation from the Burmese and Siamese, who held suzerainty over the Lanna Kingdom for centuries and who were not "people of our muang".

For the same reasons, the own name of the khon muang for their language is kammuang or kham muang, in which kam means language or word; muang town, hence the meaning "town language," in contrast to those of the many hill tribe peoples in the surrounding mountainous areas.

Prior to their integration into Thailand, the Northern Thais were known as Lao phung dam, or black-bellied Lao, due to the tradition of tattooing their abdomens (phung), which contrasted with the Lao to their east who did not have this custom.

History

Original settlement area 
The presence of the Yuan in what is now northern Thailand has been documented since the 11th century. The core of their original settlement area lies in the basin of the Kok and Ing rivers in what is now Chiang Rai Province. Since the Yuan, like other Tai peoples, traditionally live from wet rice cultivation, they only settled in the river plains of northern Thailand, but not in the mountain ranges that run through it and make up three quarters of the area. They formed small-scale principalities (Mueang). The geography of the settlement area prevented the formation of larger communities.

Independent state of Lan Na 

Mangrai, the ruler of Mueang Ngoenyang, united a number of these principalities after his accession to the throne around 1259 and founded the city of Chiang Rai in 1263. Around 1292 he conquered the Mon kingdom of Hariphunchai, which until that time had dominated large parts of what is now northern Thailand in political, economic and cultural terms. This laid the foundation for the new kingdom of Lan Na ("One Million Rice Fields") when its capital, Mangrai, founded Chiang Mai in 1296. The remaining Mueang, which were dependent on Lan Na, retained their own dynasties and extensive autonomy, but had to swear loyalty to the king and pay tribute (mandala model). Lan Na was ethnically very heterogeneous and the Northern Thai did not constitute the majority of the population in large parts of their domain.

However, the different cultures converged, so the originally animist and illiterate Tai Yuan adopted their religion, Theravada Buddhism, and their writing system from the Mon of Hariphunchai (the Tai Tham script is developed from the Old Mon script). As a result, a common identity among the peoples of Lan Na became increasingly common in the 14th century, and the non-Tai peoples largely assimilated to the Tai Yuan. Anyone who integrated themselves into the communities in the river valleys and plains (Mueang) was regarded as Tai, regardless of ethnic origin, hence the self-designation Khon Mueang. Only the indigenous peoples such as the Lawa, who lived outside the Mueang in the highlands of the mountains and practiced slash-and-burn agriculture, were not included. They were grouped together by the Tai as kha. Ethnicity was defined less by descent than by way of life.

The Tai Yuan had very close ties with the Lao kingdom of Lan Xang. In 1546, Setthathirath, a Lao prince, was elected king of Lan Na. By the middle of the 15th century at the latest, they had the technology to manufacture and use cannons and fireworks rockets. The expansion of the sphere of influence of Lan Na reached a climax in the second half of the 15th century under King Tilok. The sphere of interest of Lan Na clashed with that of the central Thai kingdom of Ayutthaya, which resulted in several wars over the Mueang of Sukhothai, Phitsanulok and Kamphaeng Phet, that lied between the two kingdoms.

The first decades of the 16th century are considered to be the heyday of the Lan Na literature. The classical works of this time, however, were not written in the native language of the Tai Yuan, but in the scholarly language of Pali. At the same time, however, Ayutthaya was expanding north and Siamese troops penetrated deep into the Yuan-inhabited area of Lan Na. The fighting was extremely costly, and a number of high-ranking generals and nobles of the Yuan perished. In addition to the population losses of men of armed age as a result of the war, large parts of the population also fell victim to natural disasters and epidemics around 1520. This initiated the decline of Lan Na. In 1558, Lan Na came under the rule of the Burmese Taungoo dynasty (Kingdom of Ava).

As there was often a shortage of labor in pre-modern Southeast Asia, it was customary after wars to drag parts of the population of the defeated party to the area of the victor. In the 17th century, after the subjugation of Lan Na by the Burmese, some Tai Yuan were brought to their capital Ava. There they belonged to the category of royal servants and provided lacquerware. The Burmese control over the Tai Yuan increased the differences between them and the Siamese in Ayutthaya.

Nevertheless, after the fall of Ayutthaya, the Tai Yuan nobility of Lan Na entered into an alliance with King Taksin of Thonburi (the new Siamese kingdom) and, with his support, shook off Burmese supremacy in 1774. But this was immediately replaced by that of the Siamese (from 1782 under the Chakri dynasty and with the capital of Bangkok). After conquering Chiang Saen, the last Burmese outpost in what is now Thailand, in 1804, they deported thousands of Tai Yuan resident there to their heartland, the Chao Phraya Basin of central Thailand. As a result, a significant number of Tai Yuan still live in the provinces of Ratchaburi and Saraburi, where in the Sao Hai District an enclave with a Tai Yuan majority still exists.

Incorporation into Thailand and Thaification 
Until the 19th century, Lan Na retained its own structure and autonomy in internal affairs within the Siamese dominion. Its inhabitants were considered western Lao (or "black-bellied Lao", due to the tradition of male Tai Yuan to tattoo themselves above the hips), but not as Siamese. The Tai Yuan also saw themselves more as relatives of the Lao than the Siamese of the central Thai lowlands. As recently as the 1980s, the government of the Lao People's Democratic Republic referred to the Tai Yuan-inhabited provinces of northern Thailand as their "lost territories". The Siamese King Rama V (Chulalongkorn) wrote in 1883 to his high commissioner in Chiang Mai about the Tai Yuan, which he called "Lao":

After Siam had to cede what is now Laos to France in 1893, the Thai government stopped designating the Lao and Tai Yuan living in Thailand as Lao in order not to justify further expansion of the French protectorate of Laos. Lan Na lost its independence in 1899, when the administrative reform under King Rama V (Chulalongkorn) introduced the centralized thesaphiban-system. Chulalongkorn's son Rama VI (Vajiravudh), who ruled from 1905, endeavored to turn the population of his empire into a nation and Thailand into a nation state. There was less and less differentiation between Siamese, Lao or Tai Yuan, instead there was increasing talk of the Thai nation. Vajiravudh strove to unite the different tribes under one dominant culture. During the Monthon reforms of the north region at the turn of the 20th century, the region of Lanna was assigned to Monthon Phayap from the Sanskrit word for "northwest".

This policy of Thaification was intensified after the end of the absolute monarchy in 1932 and the takeover of power by Plaek Phibunsongkhram in 1938. Phibunsongkhram decreed in 1939 that from now on the country should only be named Thailand and its inhabitants only Thai. He forbade any ethnic or regional differentiation. The Lanna script was subsequently repressed in favor of the Thai alphabet. The use of the central Thai dialect was also promoted in the north in order to displace the Lanna language. As a result, many Thais cannot distinguish between citizenship (san-chat) and ethnicity or origin (chuea-chat). The Lanna script formerly in use by northern Thai people is also called Tai Tham script. Due to the effects of Thaification in the wake of Monthon reforms, few northern Thai can read or write it, as it no longer represents accurately the orthography of the spoken form.

Contemporary history 

Despite the Thaification policies, the Tai Yuan have retained their own cultural identity (even if this is now mostly referred to as Northern Thai). The Tai Yuan have their own dance tradition, and a cuisine very different from that of central Thailand. Even if almost all residents of northern Thailand understand and can speak the standard Thai language (this is still compulsory in schools), most of them still speak the Northern Thai language at home. However, since 1985 the use of the language has declined. Since then, the younger generations have used the Northern Thai language less and less, so that the language was to be expected to disappear in the medium term.

On the other hand, there has been a renaissance of Lanna culture since the mid-1990s. Especially around the 700th anniversary of Chiang Mai in 1996, a great pride in its own history and tradition could be established. At Chiang Mai University in particular, a number of scholars are dedicated to researching traditions and cultivating cultural heritage. Since then, some Northern Thai women, mainly the middle and upper classes, have been wearing the classic dresses of the north again on special occasions, made of hand-made cotton. In many public institutions and government agencies it is customary to wear clothes made of traditional textiles on Fridays. There are regular performances of Lan Na music and dance, as well as demonstrations of traditional handicrafts. As an expression of the own regional character, signs with lettering in Lanna script are again being set up in some places.

See also
 Jinakalamali
 Kham Mueang
 Lan Na
 Lanna script
 Shan people
 Tai people
 Thai people
 Sibsongbanna

References

Further reading 
 
 
 
 

Yuan
Yuan